National Assembly elections were held in areas controlled by North Vietnam on 6 January 1946. Held under the 1946 constitution, they resulted in a victory for the Communist-led Việt Minh, which won 182 of the 302 seats, although the distribution of seats between parties had been decided before the elections. The ballot was not secret, and ballot papers were filled out in the presence of aides who were "to help comrades who had difficulty in making out their ballots."

Background
On 8 September 1945, six days after the proclamation of independence, Ho Chi Minh signed decree 14 on the National Assembly elections. On 17 October he signed decree 15 detailing the regulations for the elections; turnout was required to be at least 25% to validate the results, all citizens over the age of 18 had the right to vote, and those over 21 could stand as candidates. On November 11, as an effort to alleviate the fears of a Communist takeover, the Indochinese Communist Party announced its dissolution. However, it remained de facto in existence and in control of the Việt Minh.

Conduct
The elections were opposed by the French colonial authorities and their supporters, and were marked by bombings and misinformation.

Results
According to Ho Chi Minh, voter turnout was approximately 82%. Other sources put turnout at 89%.

Aftermath
The first session of the National Assembly took place on 2 March 1946. Later in the year the National Assembly ratified the first democratic constitution for the country. Under this constitution, legislative authority was vested in the National Assembly, which was the highest institution in the country. The President of the Republic was in charge of leading the government and was to be elected by the National Assembly for five year terms. The Prime Minister was chosen by the President from among the members of the National Assembly. At the sub-national level, regional assemblies were established with the power to elect regional executive committees. However, there was no separation of powers and the document did not stipulate the existence of a High Court that could rule on questions of constitutionality. The document remained in effect in Viet Minh-controlled areas and in North Vietnam throughout the First Indochina War following partition in 1954, until it was replaced with a new constitution in 1959.

References

External links
Howard R. Penniman (1972) Election in North Vietnam World Affairs

North Vietnam
Parliamentary election
Elections in North Vietnam
Election and referendum articles with incomplete results